Sins are acts of transgression against divine law.

Sins may also refer to:

Film and television
 Sins (film), a 2005 Bollywood film
 Sins (miniseries), a 1986 CBS television miniseries 
 The Sins, a 2000 British TV series
 Sins, episode from Series 7 of the British TV series Waking the Dead

Other uses
 Sins (novel), a novel written by Sionil José
 "Sins", a song by Reks from Straight, No Chaser, 2012
 Johnny Sins, American pornographic actor, director, and YouTuber
 Les Sins, moniker for American singer, songwriter Chaz Bear
 Sins, Aargau, Switzerland

See also
 Sin (disambiguation)
 Sins Invalid